Ishtar Rising, fully titled Ishtar Rising: Why the Goddess Went to Hell and What to Expect Now That She's Returning, is a book by Robert Anton Wilson published in 1989. It is a revision of Wilson's earlier The Book of the Breast, first published by Playboy Press in 1974, which contained many images not present in the current version. In it Wilson discusses his ideas on the female form, feminism and ancient Goddess worship.

References 

1989 non-fiction books
1974 non-fiction books
Discordianism
Consciousness studies
Books by Robert Anton Wilson
Playboy Press books